Byokyo (Bökö) is a rural locality (a selo), the administrative centre of and one of two settlements, in addition to  Soto, in Dogdoginsky Rural Okrug of Megino-Kangalassky District in the Sakha Republic, Russia. Its population as of the 2002 Census was 352.

References

Notes

Sources
Official website of the Sakha Republic. Registry of the Administrative-Territorial Divisions of the Sakha Republic. Megino-Kangalassky District. 

Rural localities in Megino-Kangalassky District